Elections to Manchester City Council were held on 6 May 2021, as part of the 2021 United Kingdom local elections. They were originally scheduled for 2020 but were suspended for a year, due to the COVID-19 pandemic. In 2019 Labour had retained its majority on the council, with 93 seats, with the Liberal Democrats led by former MP John Leech increasing the number of opposition councillors to three, but this had fallen back to two in March 2021 when Councillor Greg Stanton defected to the Labour Party.

Background and campaign
The following councillors, last elected in 2018, did not stand for re-election:
 Labour: Kelly Simcock (Didsbury East), Nigel Murphy (Hulme, deselected), Bernard Stone (Levenshulme), Carl Ollerhead (Moston, suspended by party in June 2020), Maddy Monaghan (Sharston), Mary Watson (Whalley Range).

One councillor from 2018–2021, Labour’s Emma Taylor, had previously been elected in Ancoats and Beswick and stood this time in a different ward, Sharston. 

Two by-elections were outstanding and were held alongside the scheduled elections of 2021: one for the seat of councillor Sue Murphy (Labour, Brooklands, elected 2019), who had died in April 2020, and the other for that of Ken Dobson (Independent, Clayton and Openshaw, elected at a by-election in February 2020), who had resigned from the council in October 2020.

Result
Summary change in vote share compared to the 2019 election. Change in number of seats compared to the composition of the council immediately before the election. Where multiple seats were contested in the same ward due to vacancies the results have been normalised.

Council composition
After the 2019 election, the composition of the council was:

Immediately prior to the election, the composition of the council was:

After the election, the composition of the council is:

Ward results 
Asterisks denote incumbent Councillors seeking re-election. Councillors seeking re-election were elected in 2018, and results are compared to that year's polls on that basis.

Ancoats and Beswick

Ardwick

Baguley

Brooklands

Burnage

Charlestown

Cheetham

Chorlton

Chorlton Park

Clayton and Openshaw

Crumpsall

Deansgate

Didsbury East

Didsbury West

Fallowfield

Gorton and Abbey Hey

Harpurhey

Higher Blackley

Hulme

Levenshulme

Longsight

Miles Platting and Newton Heath

Moss Side

Moston

Northenden

Old Moat

Piccadilly

Rusholme

Sharston

Whalley Range

Withington

Woodhouse Park

Changes since this election

Chorlton by-election
On 14 October 2021 councillor Matt Strong resigned from his seat in Chorlton, prompting a by-election that was held on 18 November 2021.

Changes in the table below are relative to the 2019 election.

Ancoats & Beswick by-election
On 30 November 2021 councillor Marcia Hutchinson resigned from her seat in Ancoats & Beswick, citing allegations of bullying and racism within the Labour group. A by-election was held on 3 February 2022, which was won by the Liberal Democrat candidate Alan Good.

References

2021
Manchester City Council election
2020s in Manchester